The SAMHO is an Indian gun-launched anti-tank guided missile (ATGM) developed by the Armament Research and Development Establishment (ARDE) for the Arjun tanks of the Indian Army. Originally intended to be fired from the 120 mm rifled gun of Arjun, the DRDO plans to make it compatible with the T-90 tanks of the Indian Army, which have a 125 mm smoothbore gun. The SAMHO has a high-explosive anti-tank (HEAT) tandem-charge warhead designed to defeat explosive reactive armour (ERA) protection of modern armoured vehicles and tanks. The SAMHO is a multi-purpose anti-armour guided missile effective against tanks and low flying attack helicopters.

Overview 
The development of SAMHO gun-launched anti-tank guided missile was announced in 2014. The SAMHO missile was developed under the Cannon Launched Missile Development Programme (CLMDP) by the ARDE lab of Defence Research and Development Organisation (DRDO) in association with High Energy Materials Research Laboratory (HEMRL) and Instruments Research and Development Establishment (IRDE). The missile is intended to enhance the firepower of the indigenous Arjun tanks in service with the Indian Army.

Testing

First trial 
The first trial occurred successfully on 22 September 2020, from an Arjun tank with an inert warhead. The missile engaged a target kept at a distance of 3 km.

Second trial 
Another successful missile firing occurred 1 October 2020.

Third trial 
On 29 June 2022, DRDO successfully tested the missile engaging a target from minimum and maximum range. This time DRDO also solved the dimensional constraints of a tank launched ATGM.

Fourth trial 
On 4 August 2022, another successful test occurred, engaging a target from minimum to maximum range to check performance consistency.

See also 

 Nag (missile)

References

Anti-tank guided missiles
Guided missiles of India